Yunfu, formerly romanized as Wanfow, and historically known as Dong'an, which was formerly romanized as Tong On, from 1578 to 1913, is a prefecture-level city in western Guangdong province, People's Republic of China. It borders Zhaoqing to the north, Foshan to the east, Jiangmen to the southeast, Yangjiang to the south, Maoming to the southwest, and the autonomous region of Guangxi to the west.

History 
The area of present-day Yunfu belonged to the Baiyue prior to the advent of the Qin dynasty, when much of Yunfu came under the jurisdiction of Guilin Commandery, while some of the area belonged to Nanhai Commandery. During portions of the Han dynasty, the area belonged to the kingdom of Nanyue. Following the fall of the Nanyue in 111 CE, the area of present-day Xinxing County was incorporated into the Western Han dynasty as Linyun County.

Jin dynasty 
Under the Jin dynasty, in 280 CE, the area of present-day Yunan County was organized as Duluo County. In 349 CE, the area of present-day Yunan County was reorganized as Jinhua County. During the final years of the Jin dynasty, from 416 CE to 420 CE, Longxiang County and Furuan County were established in present-day Luoding.

Northern and Southern dynasties 
During the Northern and Southern dynasties period, the area of present-day Yunfu was governed by the Southern Song dynasty from 420 CE to 479 CE, then by the Southern Qi dynasty from 479 CE to 502 CE, and finally by the Liang dynasty from 502 CE to 557 CE. From 557 CE to 589 CE, the area was ruled by the Chen dynasty.

Later dynasties 
The area was incorporated into the Tang dynasty in 618 CE., Following the Five Dynasties and Ten Kingdoms period, the area was conquered by the Song dynasty (not to be confused with the aforementioned Song dynasty which ruled portions of Southern China during the 5th century CE).

Republic of China 
Shortly after the creation of the Republic of China in 1912, republican officials reorganized the area multiple times. In January 1914, Xining County was renamed to Yunan County (which it is still called today), and in May 1914 Dong'an County was renamed to Yunfu County.

People's Republic of China 
Yunfu was promoted to a prefecture-level city on April 5, 1994.

In September 2014, Yun'an was promoted from a county to a district.

Geography
67.39% of Yunfu's area is forested. The Xi River runs through Yunfu.

Climate 
Yunfu is considered sub-tropical and enjoys fine weather year-round, characterized by mild air temperatures, plentiful rainfall and sunshine, with an annual average temperature of 22 °C, annual average rainfall of 1,580mm and annual average sunshine hours of 1,418. The time-space distribution of rainfall is uneven in a year. It is overcast and dry in spring, hot and rainy in the summer, cool in autumn, and dry and sunny in winter.

Administration
The prefecture-level city of Yunfu administers 5 county-level divisions, including 2 district, 1 county-level city and 2 counties.

Demographics 

According to the city government, 420,000 overseas Chinese hail from Yunfu.

Ethnicity 
Yunfu is home to 39 ethnic minorities, which comprise a total population of 14,038. The largest ethnic minorities in Yunfu are the Zhuang, Yao, Dong, and the Miao.

Language 
Several languages are commonly spoken in Yunfu, including the Yunfu Dialect of Cantonese, Hakka, Min-nan, and the Taigu Dialect. The Yunfu Dialect is the most commonly spoken in Yunfu, followed by Hakka.

Economy

Natural resources 
In the total area, the mountainous area takes up 60.5%, the hilly area takes up 30.7%, making Yunfu a typical mountainous city. The city's total population is 2,600,900 people, of which the nonagricultural population is 887,000 people and the agricultural population 1,713,900 people, the per capita cultivated area is 0.718 mu.

More than 670 types of plants used in traditional Chinese medicine are found in Yunfu.

Yunfu's city government states that there are over 50 types of mineral resources in Yunfu, including gold, silver, copper, iron, marble, granite, limestone, and pyrite. Other proven minerals in Yunfu include tin, lead, zinc and manganese, sillimanite, dolomite, barite, talc, kaolin, limestone, clay, rammell, potassium feldspar, and mineral water. The area's particularly large deposits of pyrite makes it China's largest sulfide producing region. Yunfu serves as a regional center of stone mining and stone carving. By the end of 2002, there were totally 254 certified mines throughout the city.

Tourism 

Major tourist attractions in the city include the Sixth Patriarch's Hometown Tourist Resort, Jinshuitai Hot Springs Scenic Area, Tianlu Mountain Tourist Resort, and Panlong Cave Scenic Area.

Education 
Yunfu is home to three tertiary education institutions, enrolling 13,000 students. The city has 121 secondary schools, including 15 vocational schools, enrolling 164,100 students. Yunfu also has 174 primary schools with 258,600 students.

Culture 
The city has 6 art galleries and cultural centers, 6 public libraries, and 5 museums.

Healthcare 
Yunfu has 89 medical institutions, with 10,364 beds.

Transportation
With 324 National Highway running through the whole prefecture, cement-paved roads are accessible to each single township and village. Guangzhou-Wuzhou Expressway linking Guangdong and Guangxi is also connected to Yunfu which will further be united with Yulin and Wuzhou in Guangxi as well as the expressway network in southwest China. Sanshui-Maoming Railway also passes the whole municipality, which will be eventually linked to Luoyang-Zhanjiang Railway in 2008.

The Xi River has 100 kilometers of waterway, enabling direct cargo freight to Hong Kong. The Yunfu New Port, along the Xi River, serves as Guangdong's largest inland port.

Notable people 

 Gan Zhuotang, Communist Party politician
 Cai Tingkai, National Revolutionary Army general
 Ye Jizhuang, Communist Party politician
 , Second Guangzhou Uprising protestor
 Huineng, Chan Buddhist patriarch
 Deng Fa, Communist Party politician

References

External links

Government website of Yunfu (in Simplified Chinese)
Government website of Yunfu Tourism Department (in Simplified Chinese)

 
Prefecture-level divisions of Guangdong
Autonomous regions of China
Western Han dynasty emperors